
Earthquake sensitivity and earthquake sensitive are pseudoscientific terms defined by Jim Berkland to refer to certain people who claim sensitivity to the precursors of impending earthquakes, manifested in "dreams or visions, psychic impressions, or physiological symptoms", the latter including "ear tones" (ringing in the ears), headaches, and agitation. It is claimed that "[a] person with a very sensitive body may also have some subtle reaction to whatever animals react to". Proponents have speculated that these may result from: 1) piezoelectric effects due to changes in the stress of the earth's crust, 2) low-frequency electromagnetic signals, or 3) from the emission of radon gas.

Although proponents suggest the possibility that the claimed effects might work through known physical phenomena, and thus be amenable to scientific study, these claims are pseudoscientific in that no evidence of such effects, nor any theory of how such effects might be perceived, has been presented in the scientific literature. What the scientific literature does have is various reports showing that animals do not show disturbed or altered behavior attributable to earthquake precursors (other than foreshocks). Aside from whether such phenomena can be detected (by any means), the "consistent failure to find reliable earthquake precursors" has led many scientists to question whether such precursor phenomena even exist.

Could "earthquake sensitives" be responding to some kind of "psychic impressions" or other paranormal phenomena as yet unknown to science? After reviewing the scientific literature the International Commission on Earthquake Forecasting for Civil Protection (ICEF) concluded that 

On their side, the proponents claim that there have been "many scientific papers" supporting their views, but "most have been totally rejected by the keepers of high wisdom." While scientists are quick to dismiss theories they "know, or have good reason to believe, are not credible", and especially predictions by amateurs on account of their lack of scientific rigor,
proponents claim that successful predictions can indicate a significant breakthrough, even if the details are not understood. In this regard Berkland claims "a 75 percent accuracy rate of forecasting quakes." However, these results (besides being disputed) are irrelevant in demonstrating any kind of "earthquake sensitive" effect as Berkland's predictions appear to not involve such effects.

Berkland ceased posting his predictions after June 2010. Though a few others have continued to post their predictions on Berkland's website, there appears to be no effort to correlate "ear tones" or any other physiological effect with subsequent earthquakes.

See also 
 Earthquake prediction

Notes

Sources 

 .
 .
 .
 .
 .
 .
 .
 .
 .
 .
.
 .
 .
 .
 .
 .
 .
 .

External links 
 http://www.syzygyjob.com Jim Berkland's earthquake prediction website. (Inactive since June 2010.)

Pseudoscience